The 1994 Winter Paralympics were held in Lillehammer, Norway. Australia sent six male skiers, who won three gold, two silver and four bronze medals. Australia, at the time, achieved their best ever performance at a Winter Paralympics, finishing 5th overall in the alpine skiing competition, 9th in the medal standings, and 11th in the total medal count out of 31 nations.

Background 
Despite the previous Winter Olympics being held in 1992, a 1986 decision made by the International Organising Committee (IOC) was implemented, denoting that the Summer and Winter Olympic Games be held on alternating 4 year cycles, occurring on even years. Thus, the 1994 games were held a mere 2 years after the previous Winter Olympics of Albertville (France) in 1992. The Games were held from Thursday March 10, to Saturday March 19, and consisted of 133 events across 5 sports. 31 Nations participated, with a total of 471 participating athletes. The 1994 Winter Paralympics were also the first Games organized by the International Paralympic Committee (IPC).

Logo 
The logo for the 1994 Winter Paralympics featured a white sun figure on a blue background, depicting the sun people. It aimed to evoke feelings of power, vitality, strength, and energy, seen as characteristics of disabled athletes. This was the final time the five multicolored 'tae-guks', located at the base of the illustration, were used in connection with the Paralympic Games.

Mascot 
A competition was conducted for the creation of the mascot for the 1994 Winter Paralympics, with Tor Lindrupsen winning with his drawing of 'Sondre'. The mascot for the Games, 'Sondre', is a friendly teenage troll boy who is 'charming, good-natured, elegant, and poised', and has his left leg amputated above the knee. The name of the mascot was decided via a competition, and is named after the great skiing pioneer, Sondre Nordheim.

Australia's Preparation 
Given the shorter than usual hiatus of two years between Paralympic Games, the Australian Winter Paralympic team began a two-year intensive squad development and training program. To accompany this program, high-profile coach Steve Graham was appointed as coach of the winter Paralympic team. Six separate camps were conducted in Australia between October 1992 and October 1993, followed by the selection of the Winter Paralympic team in November 1993. The team's training concluded with 4 weeks training and racing in Tamsweg, Austria, followed by one week of training at Hafjell, Norway - the location of the Alpine Skiing events during the Games. Tamsweg was chosen as a training site due to its similarity in conditions to Hafjell, Norway.

Medalists

Event Results with Australian Podium Finishes

Men's Slalom LWXI

Men's Super-G LWXI

Men's Giant Slalom LW2

Men's Slalom LW2

Men's Downhill LW9

Men's Giant Slalom LW9

Men's Super-G LW2

Men's Downhill LW2

Men's Giant Slalom LWXI

Notable Team Members

Michael Norton

Background 

Michael Norton was born in 1964, and grew up on a dairy farm in Leongatha. In February 1984, whilst riding his motorbike home from work, Michael hit a rock and came off his bike, leaving him paralysed. He established and coached at a ski school in Mount Buller for disabled people, and frequently made television appearances in a bid to raise the profile of disability sport in Australia.

Previous Sporting Success 

After his paralysis, Michael began wheelchair racing, and won the Australian wheelchair racing championship in Adelaide during February 1986. He learnt to ski in 1987, after being taught by George Macpherson, a founder of sit skiing Australia. In 1988 he was invited to Canada by ski coach Dean Sheppard, in a bid to develop a career in ski racing. Michael competed at the 1990 IPC Alpine Skiing World Championships in Colorado, as well as competing in the 1992 Tignes-Albertville Winter Paralympics. He won a bronze medal in the Men's Slalom LW11 event at the 1992 Winter Paralympics.

Lillehammer Paralympic Results 
Leading up to the 1994 Lillehammer Winter Paralympics, Michael had a crash during training that left him unconscious. Despite this, he would go on to win a gold in the Men's Slalom LWXI and the Men's Super-G LWXI. Michael's LWXI disability classification was seen as - sitting: paraplegia with fair functional sitting balance.

Michael Milton

Background 

Michael Milton was born in Canberra, in 1973. He started skiing at the age of 3, only to have his left leg amputated above the knee when he was 9 years old, due to cancer. His home ski resort is located at Thredbo, New South Wales. Michael also competed in the 2002 Salt Lake City Winter Paralympics, where he won four gold medals. He is the current Australian record holder for the fastest downhill skier (open record), posting a speed of 213.65 km/h. He also went on to compete at the 2006 Winter Paralympics. Deciding to change career paths, Michael took up cycling, and went on to win a gold medal in the 3000m Individual Pursuit at the Australian Track Cycling championship, breaking the Australian record. He was inducted into the Australian Institute of Sport 'Best of the Best' in 2001, and in 2014 was the assistant alpine skiing coach of the Australian Winter Paralympic team at the Sochi Games.

Previous Sporting Success 

Michael made his first Paralympic debut at the 1988 Innsbruck Winter Paralympics, but took home no medals. He proceeded to compete at the 1992 Tignes-Albertville Winter Paralympics, where he won a gold medal in the men's Slalom LW2 event, and a silver medal in the Men's Super-G LW2 event, for which he was awarded a medal of the Order of Australia. In 1992, he also won the slalom in the Australian Championships, and won the slalom and super giant slalom at the Columbia Crest Cup in 1993.

Lillehammer Paralympic Results 
At the 1994 Winter Paralympics, Michael made his best performance to date when he won a gold medal in the Men's Giant slalom LW2 event, a silver medal in the Men's slalom LW2 event, and bronze medals in the Men's Super-G LW2 and Downhill LW2 events. Michael's LW2 disability classification is seen as 'standing: single leg amputation above the knee'. He won a total of 4 medals at the Games, giving him a total of 6 Winter Paralympic medals at the time.

James Paterson

Background 

James Paterson was born in Terrigal, New South Wales, and was diagnosed with cerebral palsy. He worked as a marine mechanic for Halvorsen Boats, who supported his overseas preparation in the lead-up to the 1994 Games. Along with competing at the 1994 Winter Paralympics, he also competed at the 1996 IPC Alpine Skiing World Championships, where he won a silver medal and two bronze medals. Two years later, he represented Australia again at the 1998 Winter Paralympics where he was team captain and competed in four events, winning a gold medal in the Men's Downhill LW9, and a bronze medal in the Men's Slalom LW9. He also went on to win a silver medal at the 2000 IPC Alpine Skiing World Championships in the Men's Giant Slalom LW9.

Lillehammer Paralympic Results 

James made his Winter Paralympic debut at the 1994 Winter Paralympic Games, where he competed in all alpine skiing events, in the LW9 disability classification. He walked away with a silver medal in the Men's Downhill LW9, and a bronze medal in the Men's Giant Slalom LW9. James' disability classification of LW9, is seen as 'standing: amputation or equivalent impairment of one arm and one leg'.

Administration
Team officials were:

Chef de Mission - Nick Dean Manager - Ron FinneranCoaches - Steve Graham, Dean Sheppard Media - Paul Griffiths Support staff - Alan Dean, Eddie Jesiolowski, David Howells, Fiona Barnsdall

Alpine Skiing Results

Men

Alpine Skiing Medal Tally

Events

Men's Downhill 

Downhill skiing is a discipline of alpine skiing that prioritizes speed over turning or technique. A typical Downhill course starts near the top of a mountain, and has gates that are farther apart than other alpine skiing disciplines, and includes challenging turns, shallow dips, flats, and small airs. Speeds of up to 130 km/h are common in international competition.

Men's Slalom 
Slalom is an alpine skiing discipline that involves skiing between poles or gates, that are typically spaced closer together than Giant slalom or Downhill disciplines. Higher speeds are sacrificed for the need for tighter and sharper turns.

Men's Giant Slalom 
The Giant slalom involves skiing between sets of poles or gates, spaced farther apart than the slalom, but less than that those in the Super-G. A typical course must have a total vertical drop of 250m to 450m, and speeds of up to 40 km/h are common in international competition.

Men's Super-G 
Super-G (or Super-Giant slalom) is a downhill skiing discipline that also involves skiing between gates or poles. Gates are further apart in the Super-G than in the giant slalom or slalom, and speeds are therefore typically faster. In a typical Super-G course, gates are set so the skiers must turn more than in downhill (the other speed discipline).

Classifications 
Alpine skiing at the games consisted of four events for both men and women, with each event containing 12 different disability classifications.

Standing Skiers 

 LW2 - standing: single leg amputation above the knee
 LW 3 - standing: double leg amputation below the knee, mild cerebral palsy, or equivalent impairment
 LW4 - standing: single leg amputation below the knee
 LW5/7 - standing: double arm amputation
 LW6/8 - standing: single arm amputation
 LW9 - standing: amputation or equivalent impairment of one arm and one leg

Sitting Skiers 

 LWX - sitting: paraplegia with no or some upper abdominal function and no functional sitting balance
 LWXI - sitting: paraplegia with fair functional sitting balance
 LWXII - sitting: double leg amputation above the knees, or paraplegia with some leg function and good sitting balance

Visual Impairments 

 B1 - visually impaired: no functional vision
 B2 - visually impaired: up to ca 3-5% functional vision
 B3 - visually impaired: under 10% functional vision

Medal table
Australia finished in 9th (out of 31 nations) with 3 gold medals, 2 silver medals, and 4 bronze medals, for a total of 9 medals. This was a stark improvement from 2 years prior at the Albertville Paralympics, where they won 1 gold medal, 1 silver medal, and 2 bronze medals. This is Australia's second best medal position to date, surpassed only by the 2002 Salt Lake City Team who placed 8th with 6 gold medals. The 1994 Winter Paralympics was also the most medals amassed by an Australian Winter Paralympic team, contributing to almost a third of Australia's total Winter Paralympic medals (30).

Medal Table of the Top Ten Finishing Nations 

To sort this table by nation, total medal count, or any other column, click on the  icon next to the column title.

See also
 Australia at the Winter Paralympics
1994 Winter Paralympics

References 

Nations at the 1994 Winter Paralympics
1994
Paralympics